Premolo is a comune (municipality) in the Province of Bergamo in the Italian region of Lombardy, located about  northeast of Milan and about  northeast of Bergamo.

Premolo borders the following municipalities: Ardesio, Gorno, Oltre il Colle, Oneta, Parre, Ponte Nossa.

Demographic evolution

References